Daniel dos Santos da Cruz (born 1 March 2001), known as Daniel Cruz or Daniel Bahia, is a Brazilian footballer who plays as a forward for Juventude, on loan from Athletico Paranaense.

Club career
Born in Salvador, Bahia, Daniel Cruz began his career at hometown side EC Bahia, initially joining their under-14 side. In April 2021, despite having issues regarding a contract renewal, he received his first call-up to the under-23 team which played in the year's Campeonato Baiano.

Daniel Cruz made his senior debut on 4 April 2021, coming on as a half-time substitute in a 2–1 home win over Atlético de Alagoinhas. It was his only senior appearance for the club, as he was later sent back to the under-20 squad after Bahia could not reach an agreement for his renewal.

On 24 September 2021, Daniel Cruz joined Athletico Paranaense. He made his first team – and Série A – debut on 9 December, replacing Jader late into a 1–1 away draw against Sport Recife.

On 12 April 2022, Daniel Cruz moved on loan to Botafogo, being initially assigned to the B-team.

Career statistics

References

2001 births
Living people
Sportspeople from Salvador, Bahia
Brazilian footballers
Association football forwards
Campeonato Brasileiro Série A players
Esporte Clube Bahia players
Club Athletico Paranaense players
Botafogo de Futebol e Regatas players